Carl Milton White (1903 – November 8, 1983) was an American librarian who served as Director of Libraries at the Columbia University Libraries. White was born in Burnett, Oklahoma, and earned a bachelor's degree from Oklahoma Baptist University in 1925, a master's degree from Mercer University in 1928, a doctorate from Cornell University in 1933, and a bachelors in library service from Columbia University in 1934. In 1943, he became chief librarian at Columbia and dean of its school of library service, stepping down from his librarian position in 1953 in order to focus on his role as dean. Prior to Columbia, he worked as a librarian at the University of North Carolina, Fisk University, and the University of Illinois; he also directed a library program at Ankara University in Turkey, in addition to helping develop the library collection of the University of California, San Diego for four years from 1967 to 1971. In 1962, he served as program specialist in library administration at the Ford Foundation. White died in 1983, survived by his wife Ruth Bennett and two daughters.

References 

1903 births
1983 deaths

Oklahoma Baptist University alumni
Mercer University alumni
Cornell University alumni
Columbia University School of Library Service alumni
Columbia University faculty
American librarians
Columbia University librarians
University of North Carolina faculty
Fisk University faculty
University of Illinois faculty
Academic staff of Ankara University
University of California, San Diego people